The following is a list of people executed by the U.S. state of Indiana since its statehood.

A total of 20 people convicted of murder have been executed by the state of Indiana in the United States since the reinstatement of the death penalty in 1977. Before 1995, electrocution was the sole method of execution. This was replaced with lethal injection in 1995. The executions on this list are of those executed by the state government of Indiana; this list does not include persons executed within Indiana by the Federal Government. Two other people, Alton Coleman and Michael Lee Lockhart, were sentenced to death in Indiana, but executed in other states.

See also 
 Capital punishment in Indiana
 Capital punishment in the United States

External links 
Capital Punishment in Indiana- Indianapolis Star
Link to complete list of people executed in Indiana since 1900

References 

People executed by Indiana
Indiana
People executed
Executions